Kemsley is a suburb of Sittingbourne in Kent, England.

According to Edward Hasted, in 1798, who quoted Asserius Menevensis in his survey, the Danes built themselves a fortress or castle here in 893. At a place called 'Kemsley downe'. This then later became 'Castle Rough'.

At the end of the 19th century, the site on which the village sat was simply a row of cottages beside a brick works, located close to the remains of the medieval fortified manor house Castle Rough. But in 1924, with expansion impossible at the old Sittingbourne Paper Mills, owner Edward Lloyd built the new Kemsley Paper Mill, which served by a creek allowed the direct importation of raw materials to the site.

At the same time he built a garden village to house his employees, the core of which comprises the modern day Kemsley village. The narrow gauge industrial railway which served the factory is now the preserved Sittingbourne and Kemsley Light Railway, a tourist attraction. Kemsley railway station is on the Sheerness Line.

The village also has a derelict pub 'The Kemsley Arms' (which was under threat of being developed into flats) has become the first building in Swale to be listed as an “asset of community value” under new legislation.

References

Villages in Kent
Sittingbourne